Kanemura is a surname. Notable people with the surname include:

Kouhiro Kanemura (born 1970), Zainichi-Korean wrestler
Mark Kanemura (born 1983), American dancer
Miku Kanemura (born 2002), Japanese singer, model, and actress 
Osamu Kanemura (born 1964), Japanese photographer
Satoru Kanemura (born 1976), Japanese baseball player and coach